is a short, debut manga work by Ken Akamatsu, the creator of Love Hina. The manga was published on September issue of Kodansha’s Magazine Fresh on September 10, 1993. Ken Akamatsu later received Kodansha’s "Freshman Manga Award" (Japanese: /) and Special Jury Award for this work. The manga was re-published on 20 May 2001.

Plot summary
The narrative revolves around a high school student named Shinya Matsumoto and his love story, which takes place in the summer vacation. Shinya unexpectedly encounters a car accident, which results in a mother and son being taken to a hospital.  The son, Daisuke Kirishima, is completely fine while his mother, Reiko Kirishima must stay in the hospital for three weeks and is unable to look after her son thereafter. Reiko’s younger sister, Yuki Kirishima, visits the hospital but she turns out to be Shinya’s classmate and love interest. Yuki, who needs to care for Daisuke Kirishima, faces problematic situation as there is no place for Daisuke to settle down. Shinya suggests that he will provide room for Daisuke to live and Yuki visits his house on regular basis to care for them. Shinya then starts a romantic relationship with Yuki.

Main characters
 
The male protagonist. He is a high school student who originally lives alone. He undertakes the task of caring for Yuki Kirishima’s nephew Daisuke after the car accident. During the summer period he develops a relationship with Yuki.

The female protagonist. Yuki is Shinya’s classmate. She visits Shinya’s house regularly to look after Shinya and her nephew. She is good at cooking.

Yuki’s older sister. She left home in her early years and later gave birth to Daisuke. She has to stay in hospital after she get injured in a car accident and since then her son is temporarily looked after by the two leads.

Reiko’s son and Yuki’s nephew, a three-year-old boy who loves painting. He lives in Shinya’s house when his mother is in hospital.
 
The father of Reiko and Yuki. In the story he is a member of the House of Representatives.

Daisuke's father. He died one year after Daisuke was born. He shares some common characteristics with Shinya.

Name
The manga title literally means "one summer's kids' game". But the original title was eventually rejected for being criticized by the editors.

Awards
The manga won the 50th Freshman Manga Award and Special Jury Award (1993)

Significance
This is Akamatsu's first manga work to be published by a mainstream manga magazine and Akamatsu received the Shōnen Magazine Freshman Award for this work. It not only encouraged Akamatsu to become a manga artist, but also drew attentions from manga editors. Akamatsu was inspired by the plans of manga editors and this led to the creation of his later work A.I. Love You.

Footnotes

References
 Hito Natsu no Kids Game Research Institute
 Love Hina 0, Tong Li Comics

External links
 Ken Akamatsu Works Research Institute

Ken Akamatsu
1993 manga
Romance anime and manga
Shōnen manga